St. Willibrord's Abbey at Doetinchem in Gelderland is the most recently established Benedictine monastery in the Netherlands.

The monastery, dedicated to Saint Willibrord, was founded immediately after World War II by the over-populated Oosterhout Abbey. Initially the monks lived in Slangenburg Castle, which they partially restored. In the 1950s they succeeded in building a new monastery on part of the castle estate. As building materials were scarce immediately after the war, the monastery was largely built out of old paving stones, and the roofs were constructed without wood: the tiles sit directly on concrete beams.

A large new abbey church was planned, but never materialised: the present church building was originally intended as the monastery library.

References
 Sint-Willibrordsabdij website 

20th-century Christian monasteries
Benedictine monasteries in the Netherlands
Buildings and structures in Gelderland
Doetinchem
Christian organizations established in the 1940s
20th-century religious buildings and structures in the Netherlands